Roger-Vasselin is a surname. Notable people with the surname include:

 Christophe Roger-Vasselin (born 1957), French tennis player, father of Édouard
 Édouard Roger-Vasselin (born 1983), French tennis player

Compound surnames